Rifargia bichorda, or Hampson's prominent moth, is a species of moth in the family Notodontidae (the prominents). It was first described by George Hampson in 1901 and it is found in North America.

The MONA or Hodges number for Rifargia bichorda is 7965.

References

Further reading

 
 
 

Notodontidae
Articles created by Qbugbot
Moths described in 1901